Morin Lake 217 is an Indian reserve of the Lac La Ronge Indian Band in Saskatchewan. It is 24 kilometres east of Lac la Ronge. In the 2016 Canadian Census, it recorded a population of 577 living in 135 of its 155 total private dwellings. In the same year, its Community Well-Being index was calculated at 45 of 100, compared to 58.4 for the average First Nations community and 77.5 for the average non-Indigenous community.

References

Indian reserves in Saskatchewan
Division No. 18, Saskatchewan